Randori is an album by Swiss pianist and composer Nik Bärtsch's band Ronin recorded in Switzerland in 2002 and first released on the Tonus Music label.

Reception
On All About Jazz Budd Kopman noted "Listening to this would be deliciously unbearable in a live setting since you might not know whether to open your arms to the infinite or bang your head, but maybe that is also the point".

Track listing
All compositions by Nik Bärtsch.
 "Modul 15" – 9:23  
 "Modul 8_9 I" – 6:03  
 "Modul 8_9 II" – 5:51  
 "Modul 8_9 III" – 17:15  
 "Modul 10" – 10:08  
 "Modul 13" – 12:12  
 "Modul 14" – 4:58  
 "Modul 11" – 7:59  
 "Modul 15_9" – 4:22

Personnel
 Nik Bärtsch – prepared piano, synthesizer, electric piano, drums
 Björn Meyer – bass 
 Kaspar Rast – drums, udu 
 Andi Pupato – shaker, Indian bells

References

Nik Bärtsch albums
2002 albums